The 2016 FIBA Europe 3x3 Championships was the second edition of the European 3x3 basketball event that featured separate competitions for men's and women's national teams. The tournament started on 25 June 2016 with the first of the three qualifying tournaments and its final tournament was played in the AFI Cotroceni shopping mall in Bucharest, Romania between 2 and 4 September 2016.

In the men's tournament, Slovenia won their first European championship title by beating Serbia in the final. Hungary also won their first European championship title in the women's tournament, by beating Romania in the final.

Qualification
The qualification events took place in the Summer of 2016. A total of 26 teams took part in these tournaments, with 12 teams of each gender qualifying for the final championship.

Men

Qualifier 1
The first qualifying tournament took place in Escaldes-Engordany, Andorra from 25 to 26 June 2016.
The four best teams qualified for the European Championship.

Group A

Group B

Bracket

The four quarterfinal winners (Czech Republic, Slovenia, Spain, and Ukraine) qualified for the European Championship.

Qualifier 2
The second qualifying tournament took place in Amsterdam, Netherlands on 1 and 2 July 2016. The four best teams qualified for the European Championship.

Group A

Group B

Bracket

The four quarterfinal winners (Netherlands, Russia, Serbia, and Slovakia) qualified for the European Championship.

Qualifier 3
The third qualifying tournament took place in Poitiers, France on 1 and 2 July 2016. The three best teams, and hosts Romania, qualified for the European Championship.

Group A

Group B

Bracket

Hosts Romania and the two semifinal winners (France and Italy), plus fourth-placed Poland, qualified for the European Championship.

Women

Qualifier 1
The first qualifying tournament took place in Escaldes-Engordany, Andorra from 25 to 26 June 2016.
The four best teams, and hosts Romania, qualified for the European Championship.

Group A

Group B

Bracket

Hosts Romania and the three other quarterfinal winners (Hungary, Slovenia, & Switzerland), as well as fifth-placed Austria, qualified for the European Championship.

Qualifier 2
The second qualifying tournament took place in Amsterdam, Netherlands on 1 and 2 July 2016. The four best teams qualified for the European Championship.

Group A

Group B

Bracket

The four quarterfinal winners (Belgium, Czech Republic, Serbia, and Ukraine) qualified for the European Championship.

Qualifier 3
The third qualifying tournament took place in Poitiers, France on 1 and 2 July 2016. The three best teams qualified for the European Championship.

Group A

Group B

Bracket

The two semifinal winners (Italy and Russia), as well as third-placed Spain, qualified for the European Championship.

Final tournament
The second edition of the FIBA 3x3 European Championships was held in Bucharest from 2-4 September 2016. A total of 12 teams of each gender qualified for the championship through one of three qualifying tournaments.

Pools were announced on 4 August 2016.

Slovenia in the men's tournament and Hungary in the women's tournament both won their first championship in this competition by beating Serbia and Romania in the final, respectively.

Qualified teams

Men's teams
 (hosts)

Women's teams
 (hosts)

Men's tournament

Pool play
Pool A

Pool B

Pool C

Pool D

Knockout stage

Final standings

Women's tournament

Pool play
Pool A

Pool B

Pool C

Pool D

Knockout stage

Final standings

References

External links 

Results, rosters and information of the FIBA Europe Championships  
 

2016
2016 in 3x3 basketball
International basketball competitions hosted by Romania
Sport in Bucharest
2016–17 in Romanian basketball
2016–17 in European basketball